The Manitoba Teachers' Society (MTS) is the trade union representing schoolteachers in Manitoba, Canada. It was founded in 1919, and currently has around 16,000 members. It is an affiliate of the Canadian Teachers' Federation. Originally called the Manitoba Teachers' Federation, the union adopted its current name in 1942.

Mission
The Manitoba Teachers' Society is dedicated to safeguarding the welfare of teachers, the status of the teaching profession and the cause of public education in Manitoba.

Goals
 To provide for its members an organization that will give them an equal, effective and democratic opportunity to pursue their interests and aspirations as teachers.
 To achieve for and utilize on behalf of its members a system of collective bargaining that will permit a fair and open negotiation of all economic benefits, professional rights and conditions of work of teachers.
 To ensure for its members opportunities to develop their professional skills as teachers.
 To protect and defend the individual rights of its members as teachers.
 To positively influence educational change.
 To be recognized as an effective agent of public education so that government will consult and maintain a continuous dialogue with teachers.

External links

1919 establishments in Manitoba
Canadian Teachers' Federation
Education trade unions
Educational organizations based in Manitoba
Educational organizations established in 1919
Trade unions established in 1919
Trade unions in Manitoba